Suresh Krissna (born 25 June 1959) is an Indian film director who has directed Tamil, Telugu, Malayalam, Kannada, Hindi Language films. His first independent film as a director was Sathya (1988), with Kamal Haasan. He is well known for having directed Rajinikanth in four films which include, Annamalai (1992), Veera (1994), Baashha (1995) and Baba (2002). In the 1990s, he has also directed other major superstars including Mohanlal, Chiranjeevi and Salman Khan.

Early life and career 
Suresh was born to R. Krishna and K. Sharada in Bombay. He has two brothers, Sreeram and Satheesh, and one sister, actress Shanthi Krishna.

He spent his early career in Mumbai. After completing his graduation in economics he joined the Mumbai office of L. V. Prasad for accounts management. Later he became an executive assistant to L. V. Prasad and also took care of the Prasad Productions Mumbai office. When L. V. Prasad started production of Ek Duuje Ke Liye (1981), directed by K. Balachander, he assisted Prasad Productions on location. After completion of the film he went on to work for K. Balachander first assisting in Thaneer Thaneer (1981). Later he was elevated to associate director status in Achamillai Achamillai (1984).

Suresh first Independent directorial film was Sathya (1988) starring Kamal Haasan which was a remake of the Hindi movie Arjun starring Sunny Deol. In 1989, he received the Nandi Award for Best Director for Prema. Suresh Krissna became famous after he worked with Rajinikanth in the 1992 movie Annaamalai. The movie became successful at the box office with a 175-day run. In 1995, Rajnikanth and Suresh Krissna paired up once again for the movie Baashha, which received an appraisal and it broke Annaamalais record at the Box Office. The movie is considered as one of the breaking points in Rajnikanth’s career. In 2001, Suresh Krissna directed a Telugu movie, Daddy in which he worked with Chiranjeevi. In 2002, he began working on a film titled Vamana featuring Ajith Kumar, Reema Sen and Sneha. Despite the beginning production, the film was later stalled.

Suresh Krissna has directed movies like Baba (2002), Rocky – The Rebel (2006), Ilaignan (2011) and Katari Veera Surasundarangi (2012). In 2012, Suresh Krissna published a book called ‘My Days with Baashha’, in which the director has penned down his memories of making super hit films with Rajnikanth. Rajnikanth in an interview said that directors Suresh Krissna and Mani Ratnam are the ones who made him a Superstar.

He has directed films in many languages starring leading heroes like Rajinikanth, Kamal Haasan, Chiranjeevi, Venkatesh, Nagarjuna, Mohanlal, Vishnuvardhan and Salman Khan. Suresh Krissna, who has directed about 40 films so far, has also directed series on leading television channels like Sun TV and Vijay TV. He directed the Mahabharatham (2013) serial on Sun TV. Suresh Krissna is getting into the web series space with In the Name of God (2021), to be streamed in Telugu, which he has produced.

As director

Films

Television

References

External links 
 
 

Living people
20th-century Indian film directors
Tamil film directors
Telugu film directors
Kannada film directors
Nandi Award winners
Film directors from Mumbai
21st-century Indian film directors
Malayalam film directors
Hindi-language film directors
1959 births